The 1999 Kansas Jayhawks football team represented the University of Kansas in the 1999 NCAA Division I-A football season. They participated as members of the Big 12 Conference in the North Division. They were coached by head coach Terry Allen. They played their home games at Memorial Stadium in Lawrence, Kansas.

Schedule

Roster

References

Kansas
Kansas Jayhawks football seasons
Kansas Jayhawks football